WQZS (93.3 FM) – branded QZ-93 – is a commercial oldies and classic rock radio station licensed to serve Meyersdale, Pennsylvania. Locally owned by Roger Wahl, the station services Somerset County along with nearby Cumberland, Frostburg, and Oakland, and is the regional affiliate for CBS News Radio. The founder of WQZS, Wahl also acts as both the station's operations manager and morning host, billed on-air as "The Commander".

The station only currently operates via an analog transmission, with a Facebook page being their lone online presence.

History

Beginnings
The station was founded by Roger Wahl, a Somerset County native who worked in the Altoona radio market during the early and mid-1970s. He gave up working in radio to care for an ailing family member in the late 1970s and returned to the Meyersdale area as a result. He was working as a regional sales manager for a Maryland beer distributor when he began planning WQZS. One of Wahl's customers on his account list owned a radio station, and the two men struck up a friendship which frequently included radio shop talk.

Wahl applied for a construction permit on August 8, 1988, but it was not until July 1990 that the FCC granted the application, turning away another applicant for the frequency. From a transmitter on Mount Davis, the state's highest point, WQZS began broadcasting on October 26, 1992, with an oldies format. The station operated with a staff of nine: three sales consultants, a receptionist, a news director, three announcers, and Wahl, taking the title of Station Director.

Legal Issues
Wahl was arrested in September 2019 amid accusations that he created a fake dating profile and used it to solicit men to rape a 61-year-old woman known to him. Wahl was further accused of placing a trail camera in the woman's bathroom without her knowledge or consent. The victim also obtained a protection from abuse order against Wahl. Wahl waived his right to a preliminary hearing in November 2019 and negotiated a guilty plea in Somerset County Court in June 2020.

In March 2020, Wahl filed an application to transfer control of WQZS to his daughter, Wendy Sipple, for $10. The FCC approved the transfer on June 1, 2020; after the guilty plea, it reversed its decision in a July 13 order, returning the application to pending status. Wahl was sentenced November 17, 2020, on felony charges of criminal use of a communications facility, misdemeanor charges of reckless endangerment, unlawful dissemination of an intimate image, tampering with evidence, and identity theft; however, he was not incarcerated due to his age, health, and risks involved with incarceration due to the COVID-19 pandemic. He was instead sentenced to three years of restricted probation, with four months of electronic monitoring. He was also forbidden from being on the air during the electronic monitoring.

On October 19, 2021, the FCC issued a hearing designation order beginning a proceeding to revoke WQZS's license as a result of his multiple misdemeanors; it also held the application to transfer WQZS to Sipple in abeyance. A decision is pending from an administrative law judge to determine Wahl's fitness as a licensee. As of August 2, 2022, the Administrative Law Judge overseeing the case has terminated hearing proceedings which will permit the FCC enforcement bureau to revoke the license of WQZS when it expires at the end of August 2022.

References

External links
WQZS 93.3 Facebook

QZS
QZS
Radio stations established in 1992
1992 establishments in Pennsylvania